Dyspessa dueldueli is a species of moth of the family Cossidae. It is found in Turkey and Libya.

References

Moths described in 1939
Dyspessa
Moths of Asia